Adnan Mravac  (born 10 April 1982) is a Bosnian-Herzegovinian former professional footballer who played as a defender. He made 13 appearances for the Bosnia and Herzegovina national team.

He also holds Austrian citizenship.

International career
He made his debut for Bosnia and Herzegovina in an October 2008 FIFA World Cup qualification match against Armenia and has earned a total of 13 caps, scoring no goals. His final international was an August 2011 friendly match against Greece.

References

External links

1981 births
Living people
Sportspeople from Banja Luka
Austrian people of Bosnia and Herzegovina descent
Association football central defenders
Bosnia and Herzegovina footballers
Bosnia and Herzegovina under-21 international footballers
Bosnia and Herzegovina international footballers
Lillestrøm SK players
NK Čakovec players
SV Mattersburg players
K.V.C. Westerlo players
Dynamo Dresden players
Norwegian Third Division players
Croatian Football League players
Austrian Football Bundesliga players
2. Liga (Austria) players
Belgian Pro League players
2. Bundesliga players
Austrian Landesliga players
Bosnia and Herzegovina expatriate footballers
Expatriate footballers in Croatia
Bosnia and Herzegovina expatriate sportspeople in Croatia
Expatriate footballers in Norway
Bosnia and Herzegovina expatriate sportspeople in Norway
Expatriate footballers in Austria
Bosnia and Herzegovina expatriate sportspeople in Austria
Expatriate footballers in Belgium
Bosnia and Herzegovina expatriate sportspeople in Belgium
Expatriate footballers in Germany
Bosnia and Herzegovina expatriate sportspeople in Germany